Tadas Vyskupaitis (born 16 December 1974) is a Lithuanian curler and curling coach.

He started curling in 2008.

Currently he works for Lithuanian Curling Association as a Project Coordinator of 2022 European Curling Championships C-Division tournament in Vilnius at May 2022.

Teams

Men's

Mixed doubles

Record as a coach of national teams

References

External links

 Tadas Vyskupaitis - Rekvizitai.lt
 Tadas Vyskupaitis #128228 | Professional Disc Golf Association

Living people
1974 births
Lithuanian male curlers

Lithuanian curling coaches
Place of birth missing (living people)